Kyle Herbert Wooten (August 28, 1897 – July 31, 1935) was an American harmonica player during the 1920s and 1930s best known for the choking blues. Born in Lumber City, Georgia, he was considered part of the backwoods scene, a subgenre of Appalachian music, and incorporated imitations of animals and imitations of inanimate sounds in his play.

He died in Lumber City of tuberculosis, aged 38.

References

1897 births
1935 deaths
American harmonica players
Musicians from Georgia (U.S. state)
People from Telfair County, Georgia
Tuberculosis deaths in Georgia (U.S. state)
20th-century deaths from tuberculosis